This article contains a list of champions in the Dutch and Benelux Formula Ford championship. (See talk)

1970-'92: 1600cc engine

1993-'97: 1800cc and 1600cc engines
The year 1993 saw the introduction of the 1800cc Zetec engine to the Dutch and Benelux championship. It had a slow start so the older 1600cc Kent engine was maintained to keep competition numbers up.

1998-2006: Zetec engines
Since 1998, in both the Dutch and Benelux championships the rules state that participants should use an 1800 cc engine. The first division championship mentioned in this list is a subchampionship, for participants with cars of two years and older of age.

2007: Introduction of the Duratec engines
In 2007 a new brand of engines was attracted to the championship.  The 1600cc Duratec engines were 30 kilos lighter than the old 1800cc Zetec engines but also more powerful.  Cars with the new Duratec engines formed the A-class while cars with the old Zetec engines formed the First Division class.

References

External links

 Formula Ford Club Holland 
 GEVA racing team, multiple champions 

Formula Ford